Shellbrook-Spiritwood was a constituency of the Legislative Assembly of Saskatchewan.

History 
The riding was created out of Shellbrook.

Geography 
Spiritwood was in the constituency.

Representation

References 

Former provincial electoral districts of Saskatchewan
Constituencies established in 1995
Constituencies disestablished in 2003